Arnold Rudolph Baar (June 12, 1891 – October 14, 1954) was a judge of the United States Tax Court in 1954.

Born in Jersey City, New Jersey, Baar received his J.D. from the University of Chicago Law School in 1914, and commenced the practice of law that same year.

He joined the Chicago firm of Kixmiller, Baar and Morris in 1917, and eventually became a partner, serving in that role for many years. He and firm partner George Maurice Morris co-authored a book, Hidden Taxes in Corporate Reorganization. In 1954, President Dwight D. Eisenhower appointed Baar to a seat on the United States Tax Court, with Baar taking office in April of that year. Baar's appointment was for a term ending in 1960, but Baar died from a heart ailment after serving for only six months, at Evanston Hospital in Evanston, Illinois.

References

1891 births
1954 deaths
Lawyers from Chicago
People from Jersey City, New Jersey
University of Chicago Law School alumni
Judges of the United States Tax Court
United States Article I federal judges appointed by Dwight D. Eisenhower